The Diplostraca or Cladocera, commonly known as water fleas, are a superorder of small crustaceans that feed on microscopic chunks of organic matter (excluding some predatory forms).

Over 1000 species have been recognised so far, with many more undescribed. The oldest fossils of diplostracans date to the Jurassic, though their modern morphology suggests that they originated substantially earlier, during the Paleozoic. Some have also adapted to a life in the ocean, the only members of Branchiopoda to do so, even if several anostracans live in hypersaline lakes. Most species show cyclical parthenogenesis, where asexual reproduction is occasionally supplemented by sexual reproduction, which produces resting eggs that allow the species to survive harsh conditions and disperse to distant habitats.

Description

The body is not obviously segmented and bears a folded carapace which covers the thorax and abdomen.

The head is angled downwards, and may be separated from the rest of the body by a "cervical sinus" or notch. It bears a single black compound eye, located on the animal's midline, in all but two genera, and often, a single ocellus is present. The head also bears two pairs of antennae – the first antennae are small, unsegmented appendages, while the second antennae are large, segmented, and branched, with powerful muscles. The first antennae bear olfactory setae, while the second are used for swimming by most species. The pattern of setae on the second antennae is useful for identification. The part of the head which projects in front of the first antennae is known as the rostrum or "beak".

The mouthparts are small, and consist of an unpaired labrum, a pair of mandibles, a pair of maxillae, and an unpaired labium. They are used to eat "organic detritus of all kinds" and bacteria.

The thorax bears five or six pairs of lobed, leaf-like appendages, each with numerous hairs or setae. Carbon dioxide is lost, and oxygen taken up, through the body surface.

Lifecycle

With the exception of a few purely asexual species, the lifecycle of diplostracans is dominated by asexual reproduction, with occasional periods of sexual reproduction; this is known as cyclical parthenogenesis. When conditions are favourable, reproduction occurs by parthenogenesis for several generations, producing only female clones. As the conditions deteriorate, males are produced, and sexual reproduction occurs. This results in the production of long-lasting dormant eggs. These ephippial eggs can be transported over land by wind, and hatch when they reach favourable conditions, allowing many species to have very wide – even cosmopolitan – distributions. Except for the genus Leptodora, which has a metanauplius stage, a nauplius larval stage is absent in Diplostraca.

Evolutionary history 
Diplostraca are nested within the clam shrimp, being most closely related to the order Cyclestherida, the only living genus of which is Cyclestheria. Though several fossils from the Paleozoic have been claimed to represent fossils of diplostracans, none of these records can be confirmed. The oldest confirmed records of diplostracans are from the Early Jurassic of Asia. Fossils from the Jurassic are assignable to modern as well as extinct groups, indicating that the initial radiation of the group occurred prior to the beginning of the Jurassic, likely during the late Paleozoic.

Ecology

Most diplostracan species live in fresh water and other inland water bodies, with only eight species being truly oceanic. The marine species are all in the family Podonidae, except for the genus Penilia. Some diplostracans inhabit leaf litter.

Taxonomy

According to the World Registry of Marine Species, Cladocera is a synonym of the superorder Diplostraca, which is included in the class Branchiopoda. Both names are currently in use. The superorder forms a monophyletic group of 7 orders, about 24 families, and more than 11,000 species. Many more species remain undescribed. The genus Daphnia alone contains around 150 species. Many groups of the water fleas are cryptic species or species flocks.

The following families are recognised:

Superorder Diplostraca Gerstaecker, 1866 (=Cladocera)

 Order Anomopoda G.O. Sars, 1865
 Family Acantholeberidae Smirnov, 1976
 Family Bosminidae Baird, 1845
 Family Chydoridae Dybowski & Grochowski, 1894
 Family Daphniidae Straus, 1820
 Family Dumontiidae Santos-Flores & Dodson, 2003
 Family Eurycercidae Kurz, 1875
 Family Gondwanothrichidae Van Damme, Shiel & Dumont, 2007
 Family Ilyocryptidae Smirnov, 1976
 Family Macrothricidae Norman & Brady, 1867
 Family Moinidae Goulden, 1968
 Family Ophryoxidae Smirnov, 1976
 Order Ctenopoda G.O. Sars, 1865
 Family Holopediidae G.O. Sars, 1865
 Family Pseudopenilidae Korovchinsky & Sergeeva, 2008
 Family Sididae Baird, 1850
 Order Cyclestherida Sars G.O., 1899
 Family Cyclestheriidae Sars G.O., 1899
 Order Haplopoda G.O. Sars, 1865
 Family Leptodoridae Lilljeborg, 1861
 Order Laevicaudata Linder, 1945
 Family Lynceidae Stebbing, 1902
 Order Onychopoda G.O. Sars, 1865
 Family Cercopagididae Mordukhai-Boltovskoi, 1968
 Family Podonidae Mordukhai-Boltovskoi, 1968
 Family Polyphemidae Baird, 1845
 Order Spinicaudata Linder, 1945
 Family Cyzicidae Stebbing, 1910
 Family Eocyzicidae Schwentner, et al., 2020
 Family Leptestheriidae Daday, 1913: 44
 Family Limnadiidae Burmeister, 1843

Etymology

See also

Bythotrephes longimanus (invasive species) [formerly known as Bythotrephes cederstroemi] - Spiny Water Flea
Cercopagis pengoi (invasive species)
Daphnia lumholtzi (invasive species)
Moina (smallest)
Zooplankton

References

 Brusca, R.C.; Brusca, G.J. (1990). Invertebrates. Sinauer Associates: Sunderland, MA (USA). ISBN 0-87893-098-1. 922 pp
 Martin, J.W., & Davis, G.E. (2001). An updated classification of the recent Crustacea. Science Series, 39. Natural History Museum of Los Angeles County. Los Angeles, CA (USA). 124 pp.
Norambuena, J., J. Farías & P. De los Ríos. (2019). he water flea Daphnia pulex (Cladocera, Daphniidae), a possible model organism to evaluate aspects of freshwater ecosystems. Crustaceana, (11-12): 1415-1426.

External links
Cladocera – Guide to the Marine Zooplankton of South Eastern Australia

 
Freshwater crustaceans
Crustacean orders